Raúl García Fernández (born 30 June 1976) is a Spanish retired professional footballer who played as a defender. He could occupy all three defensive positions.

He amassed Segunda División B totals of 461 matches and eight goals over 15 seasons, representing in the competition six clubs, mainly Barakaldo and Burgos.

Club career
Born in Hernani, Gipuzkoa, García's 19-year senior career was spent mainly in the lower leagues of his country, mostly with Barakaldo CF, Burgos CF (four years apiece) and CD Mirandés (three). He played 75 games in Segunda División over three seasons, with SD Eibar and Mirandés.

During the 2012–13 campaign, whilst with the latter side, the 36-year-old García suffered a serious injury to the meniscus on his left knee, being sidelined for two months. He scored his first and only goal in the second tier on 20 October 2012, contributing decisively to a 1–1 home draw against Girona FC. He left the club in July of the following year, and retired shortly after.

References

External links

1976 births
Living people
People from Hernani
Sportspeople from Gipuzkoa
Spanish footballers
Footballers from the Basque Country (autonomous community)
Association football defenders
Segunda División players
Segunda División B players
Real Unión footballers
Racing de Ferrol footballers
Barakaldo CF footballers
Burgos CF footballers
CF Palencia footballers
SD Eibar footballers
CD Mirandés footballers